LeShay Tomlinson, also known as Leshay Tomlinson and Leshay N. Tomlinson, is an American actress, best known for her role as Cathy in R. Kelly's hip hopera, Trapped in the Closet. Cathy is noteworthy as the woman whose tryst with Kelly's character sets in motion the many revelations and cliffhangers which provide the hiphopera's dramatic skeleton.

A LeShay Tomlinson had filled small roles in a number of motion pictures prior to her work with R. Kelly; including the Princess Monique short "The Call" with Closet co-star Cat Wilson, folk music parody A Mighty Wind and the Brosnan/Hayek crime drama After the Sunset.

Filmography

Film

Television

Web

References

External links

1975 births
Living people
African-American actresses
American film actresses
American television actresses
21st-century African-American people
21st-century African-American women
20th-century African-American people
20th-century African-American women